Potawatomi State Park is a  Wisconsin state park northwest of the city of Sturgeon Bay, Wisconsin in the Town of Nasewaupee. It is located in Door County along Sturgeon Bay, a bay within the bay of Green Bay. Potawatomi State Park was established in 1928.

History
The federal government began a quarry operation at what is now Potawatomi State Park in 1834. Two years later, the Menominee ceded their claim to the Door Peninsula, including the area which became Potawatomi State Park, to the United States in the 1831 Treaty of Washington. Following the treaty the lands surrounding what is now the park were opened to settlement, which meant that the more decentralized Potawatomi in the area were divested of their land without compensation.

In 1837 the federal government enacted a 1,000 acre federal reservation on the site. This legal designation prevented the area from being sold to settlers or absentee landowners. Instead it was reserved for federal ownership and came to be called "Government Bluff". The rationale for not selling the land was twofold. The area was considered strategically valuable for military purposes because it had a commanding view of Sturgeon Bay and Green Bay. In addition the land was valuable because high quality dolomite could be quarried from the area.

The nature and scenic resources of Government Bluff were apparently coveted by the local inhabitants. Historical accounts give the distinct impression that the reservation's inaccessibility to the public was an unpopular restriction. Quarry operation never grew to the extent of several other local quarries, but the property remained in federal ownership until 1928.

Potawatomi State Park was created in 1928 by the Wisconsin state legislature after the purchase of 1,046.10 acres from the federal government. During the ten succeeding years after the property was purchase, facilities for camping, picnicking, and hiking were developed.

In the 1950s, other improvements to the park were made, including new toilets, park service building, and a new picnic shelter. A new park office building was built in 1983–1984.

An interesting facet to the history of the park was the development of a winter sports recreation area. The facilities were developed in 1941 in cooperation with a group of winter sports enthusiasts known as the Sturgeon Bay Winter Sports Club. Downhill skiing, tobogganing, and ski-jumping were popular activities. Tows for skiers and tobogganers were provided as were rental equipment, food, and beverages.

The area was operated by different groups with various names over the years. The area at one time exclusively a downhill ski hill with two main ski runs and a recently installed chairlift. A non-profit corporation, the Potawatomi Ski Club, leased the ski area from the state and operated it for public recreation.

The ski hill closed following the 1997–1998 season due to an insufficient number of volunteers, club members being made personally responsible for maintenance expenditures, and a string of mild winters.

Activities and amenities
Trails: The park has several hiking trails and is the eastern terminus of the Ice Age National Scenic Trail. Park trails are used for hiking, bicycling, cross-country skiing, and snowmobiling.
Green Bay: The park has two miles of water frontage on Green Bay which provides opportunities for boating, canoeing, and fishing.

Climate

Gallery

See also
National Register of Historic Places listings in Door County, Wisconsin § Potawatomi State Park Observation Tower

References

External links

Potawatomi State Park
Interactive trail map (Trail Genius)
Summer Use Map (pdf, Wisconsin DNR, archived June 24, 2021)
Winter Use Map (pdf, Wisconsin DNR, archived June 24, 2021)
Hunting and Trapping Map (pdf, Wisconsin DNR, archived June 24, 2021)

1928 establishments in Wisconsin
Protected areas established in 1928
Protected areas of Door County, Wisconsin
State parks of Wisconsin